is a former Japanese football player.

Club statistics

References

External links

1985 births
Living people
University of Tsukuba alumni
Association football people from Hokkaido
Japanese footballers
J1 League players
J2 League players
Japan Football League players
Vegalta Sendai players
FC Ryukyu players
Association football midfielders